Invermay Soccer club was a football (soccer) club which represented the Launceston suburb of Invermay in the Northern Premier league. Although highly successful in the northern competition which they won 8 times, they were never quite able to convert that success to a statewide level. Invermay dominated the northern competition in the late 1940s before fading into obscurity.

Honours
State Championships: Once (1949)
State Championship Runners-up: 8 times (1929,1937,1938,1946,1947,1948,1950,1951)
Northern Premierships: 9 times (1929,1937,1938,1946,1947,1948,1949,1950,1951)

Defunct soccer clubs in Tasmania
Defunct soccer clubs in Australia